Zalarinsky District is an administrative district, one of the thirty-three in Irkutsk Oblast, Russia. Municipally, it is incorporated as Zalarinsky Municipal District. Its administrative center is the urban locality (a work settlement) of Zalari. Population:  32,010 (2002 Census);  The population of Zalari accounts for 34.0% of the district's total population.

References

Notes

Sources

Districts of Irkutsk Oblast